The Oman Arena (originally Jackson Coliseum) is a 5,600-seat multi-purpose arena, in Jackson, Tennessee, USA. It was opened in 1967, and is architecturally similar to the Mid-South Coliseum in Memphis, which was built four years earlier and seats almost twice as many patrons as Oman Arena.

The arena is located between the campuses of Madison Academic Magnet High School and the former Jackson Central-Merry High School, in central Jackson.

In the 1980s, it was renamed in honor of the late Tury Oman, a local long-time coach.

From 1990 to 2011, it hosted the NAIA Women's Division I National Championship Basketball Tournament, and was also the long-time home of the Tennessee Secondary School Athletic Association girls state basketball tournament.

It hosts other local sporting events and concerts.

External links
Map: 

Basketball venues in Tennessee
Indoor arenas in Tennessee
Buildings and structures in Madison County, Tennessee
Sports venues completed in 1967
1967 establishments in Tennessee
Sports in Jackson, Tennessee